Seven Arts Productions was a production company which made films for release by other studios. It was founded in 1957 by Eliot Hyman, Ray Stark, and Norman Katz.

History 
Seven Arts' first film was The Gun Runners, released by United Artists.

Among its productions were The Misfits (1961) for United Artists, Gigot (1962) for Twentieth Century-Fox, Lolita (1962) for Metro-Goldwyn-Mayer, What Ever Happened to Baby Jane? (1962) for Warner Bros., and Is Paris Burning? (1966) for Paramount Pictures.

Over time it expanded its role, becoming equity investors with other studios and partnering with British horror film company Hammer Film Productions on many projects. It also retained ancillary rights on new productions surrendered on earlier films, including Seven Days in May (1964) and Promise Her Anything (1965) for release by Paramount.

Seven Arts also distributed feature films and TV programs for television. Warner Bros. licensed the TV rights to its post-1949 library to Seven Arts in 1960. Seven Arts made similar deals with 20th Century Fox and Universal Pictures. Seven Arts also acquired theatrical reissue rights to some Fox films as well.

In 1967, Seven Arts Productions acquired the controlling interest in Warner Bros. Pictures from Jack L. Warner for $32 million. The companies were merged as Warner Bros.-Seven Arts. It was rebranded as Warner Bros. Inc. after Kinney National Company bought the company in 1969.

Other uses 
Neither the later Seven Arts Pictures nor the defunct releasing company "Seven Arts", an early 1990s joint venture between Carolco Pictures and New Line Cinema (the latter which subsequently merged into Warner Bros.), is related to the original Seven Arts Productions.


Select filmography 

 The Gun Runners (1958); with United Artists
 Thunder in the Sun (1959); with Paramount Pictures 
 Ten Seconds to Hell (1959); with United Artists
 The Misfits (1961); with United Artists
 By Love Possessed (1961); with United Artists
 West Side Story (1961); with United Artists
 The Count of Monte Cristo (1961)
 The Roman Spring of Mrs Stone (1961)
 Gigot (1962); with Twentieth Century Fox
 Lolita (1962); with MGM
 What Ever Happened to Baby Jane? (1962); with Warner Bros.
 Two for the Seesaw (1962); with United Artists
 The Main Attraction (1962); with MGM
 The Wild Affair (1963); with Bryanston Films & British Lion Films
 Sunday in New York (1963); with MGM
 Rampage (1963); with Warner Bros.
 Tamahine (1963); with MGM
 The Night of the Iguana (1964); with MGM
 Of Human Bondage (1964); with MGM
 Never Put It in Writing (1964); with Allied Artists Pictures
 Seven Days in May (1964); with Joel Productions, John Frankenheimer Productions and Paramount Pictures
 A Global Affair (1964); with MGM
 Promise Her Anything (1965); with Paramount Pictures
 The Nanny (1965); with Hammer Films
 The Hill (1965); with MGM
 Is Paris Burning? (1966); with Paramount Pictures
 The Defector (1966)
 Dracula: Prince of Darkness (1966); with Hammer Films
 One Million Years B.C. (1966); with Hammer Films
 The Frozen Dead (1966)
 The Bible: In the Beginning... (1966); with Twentieth Century Fox
 This Property Is Condemned (1966); with Paramount Pictures
 Assault on a Queen (1966); with Paramount Pictures
 Rasputin the Mad Monk (1966); with Hammer Films
 The Reptile (1966); with Hammer Films
 The Plague of the Zombies (1966); with Hammer Films
 You're a Big Boy Now (1966)
 Drop Dead Darling (1966); with Paramount Pictures
 Once Before I Die (1966)
 Slave Girls (1967); with Hammer Films
 Oh Dad, Poor Dad, Mamma's Hung You in the Closet and I'm Feelin' So Sad (1967); with Paramount Pictures
 The Viking Queen (1967); with Hammer Films
 The Dirty Dozen (1967); with MGM
 The Shuttered Room (1967)
 It! (1967)
 A Challenge for Robin Hood (1967); with Hammer Films
 The Anniversary (1968); with Hammer Films
 The Vengeance of She (1968); with Hammer Films
 The Lost Continent (1968); with Hammer Films
 The Devil Rides Out (1968); with Hammer Films

Theatre credits 
 The World of Suzie Wong (1958–60)
 Everybody Loves Opal (1961)
 Funny Girl (1964–67)
 Any Wednesday (1964–66)
 The Owl and the Pussycat (1964–65)

References

External links 
 

American companies established in 1957
Film production companies of the United States
Warner Bros. Discovery subsidiaries
Defunct mass media companies of the United States
Entertainment companies based in California
Companies based in Los Angeles County, California
Entertainment companies established in 1957
Mass media companies established in 1957
Mass media companies disestablished in 1967
Defunct companies based in Greater Los Angeles